The Saudi Environmental Society (SENS) is a Saudi society was founded as a national non-profit society in 2006 according to a decision of the Ministry of Social Affairs No. (34770), and is registered in the charities records under the number (335) and the date of 14/5/1427 AH. The Saudi Environment Society is chaired by Prince Turki bin Nasser.

Under this decision – the founding decision – a number of missions have been authorized to the society, mainly the development of the Saudi environment and improving the residents’ conditions in regions and provinces that suffer environmental problems by working on creating sustainable development programs. In addition to working on developing the voluntary action by creating a broad base of volunteers and to contribute in strengthening the role of the private sector to serve the environmental issues in the areas of environmental protection and conservation of natural resources and wildlife.

Board of directors

 Turki bin Nasser, President of Saudi Environment Society
 Abdul Aziz Al Hamid Abu Znadh, vice President
 Faisal Hamzah Abu Rdeif, Secretary
 Osama Abdullah Kokandi, Treasurer
 Saleh Mohammed Bin Laden, Board Member
 Tariq Abdul Hadi Taher, Board Member
 Saied Fathi Khaweli, Board Member
 Engineer Adel Salem Badeeb, Board Member
 Magda Abu Ras, Deputy Director

References

Environmental organisations based in Saudi Arabia